The Asakaze-class destroyer is a class of destroyers of the Japan Maritime Self-Defense Force.

Development 

In 1951, General Matthew Ridgway, Supreme Commander of the Allied Forces, proposed to lend a patrol frigate (PF) and a landing support boat (LSSL) to Japan under Allied occupation. In response to this, on 26 April 1952, the Coastal Safety Force was established within the Japan Coast Guard to serve as a receiver for these warships and as the base of a future navy. Then, with the establishment of the National Safety Agency on 1 August, the same year, the Coast Guard was reorganized into a security force by absorbing the route enlightenment department of the Japan Coast Guard, and together with the National Police Reserve (later the National Safety Force), which is a land unit, it became a subordinate and was set up for a full-scale reorganization system.

Of the rented vessels, all 18 of the PFs were delivered during 1953 and commissioned as s, which later became the starting point for the development of the Maritime Self-Defense Force escort vessels. In the budget for 1952, which is the year when the guards were established, the construction of support vessels (water vessels, heavy oil vessels, etc.) to improve the operational base of these guard vessels was prioritized, and the construction of combat ships was not carried out. Although domestic construction of security vessels began in 1953, the construction in the same year was two 1,600-ton instep security vessels (DD; Harukaze class) and 1,000-ton B-type security vessels ( and ) It was fastened to 3 ships.

Ships in the class

Gallery

References 

Destroyer classes
Gleaves-class destroyers of the Japan Maritime Self-Defense Force